Dózsa Debreceni, or Dózsa of Debrecen (died in 1322 or 1323), was an influential lord in the Kingdom of Hungary in the early 14th century. He was Palatine in 1322, and Voivode of Transylvania between 1318 and 1321. He was one of the staunchest supporters of Charles I of Hungary.

References

Sources 

 
 
 
 
 
 
 
 
 
 
 

1320s deaths
Palatines of Hungary
Voivodes of Transylvania
Medieval Hungarian soldiers
Year of birth unknown
13th-century Hungarian people
14th-century Hungarian people